The Prayer Book Society can refer to

 Prayer Book Society (England)
 Prayer Book Society of the USA
 Prayer Book Society of Canada
 Scottish Prayer Book Society